Ivo Minář (born 21 May 1984) is a former professional male tennis player from the Czech Republic. On July 20, 2009, Minář reached his career-high singles ranking of World No. 62. His brother Jan is also a professional player, who has been ranked in the top 200 in the world.

Minář was a member of the winning Czech Republic team in the 2012 Davis Cup.

Minář also worked as coach of Czech tennis player Kristýna Plíšková.

Career

Minář won the European junior championships in Klosters when he was 16, defeating fellow Czech Tomáš Berdych.

Professional career

In his career, he has not won an ATP singles title, but has reached one singles final – in 2005 in Sydney, where he lost to Lleyton Hewitt of Australia. On his way to that final, he dispatched three future top 10 stars in Nikolay Davydenko, Fernando Verdasco and Radek Stepanek.  Later that year, he qualified for the tournament in Dubai and pushed World No. 1 Roger Federer to final set tie-break in the first round, losing 7–6(5), 3–6, 6–7(5).

Minář tested positive for methylhexanamine on 11 July 2009 and was suspended eight months.

ATP Tour finals

Singles: 1 (0–1)

Doubles: 1 (1–0)

Challenger finals

Singles: 17 (9–8)

Doubles: 1 (0–1)

References

External links
 
 
 
 Minar world ranking history

1984 births
Living people
Czech male tennis players
Doping cases in tennis
Olympic tennis players of the Czech Republic
Tennis players from Prague
Tennis players at the 2008 Summer Olympics
Czech sportspeople in doping cases